The 2017–18 Ram Slam T20 Challenge was the fifteenth season of the CSA T20 Challenge, established by Cricket South Africa. It started on 10 November 2017 and finished on 16 December 2017. Titans were the defending champions.

The tournament was originally scheduled to be played between 14 March and 15 April 2018. However, after the first season of the T20 Global League was postponed, the tournament was brought forward to November 2017. It was going to be the second consecutive tournament played without a sponsor. However, in November 2017, Cricket South Africa announced it would be branded as the Ram Slam T20 Challenge again.

During the tournament, Dolphins had five of their matches washed out. Despite the rain-affected games, Dolphins finished second in the group-stage and were joined in the semi-finals with Titans, Cape Cobras and Warriors. In the first semi-final, Titans beat Warriors by 8 wickets to advance to the final. The second semi-final between Dolphins and Cape Cobras was washed out with no play possible. There was no reserve day, so Dolphins advanced to the final after they finished above Cape Cobras in the group stage. In the final, Titans beat Dolphins by 7 wickets to win the tournament for a third consecutive time.

Squads

Points table

Fixtures

Round-robin

Finals

References

External links
 Series home at ESPN Cricinfo

South African domestic cricket competitions
CSA T20 Challenge
2017–18 South African cricket season